The Chinese Taipei national under-17 football team is the under-17 football team of Taiwan and is controlled by the Chinese Taipei Football Association.

Competitive record

FIFA U-17 World Cup

AFC U-16 Championship

OFC U-17 Championship

Asian national under-17 association football teams
under-17
National youth sports teams of Taiwan